Jens Nohka (born 5 October 1976 in Frankfurt (Oder)) is a German bobsledder who's competing from 1999. He won a silver medal in the four-man event at the 2004 FIBT World Championships in Königssee.

References
Bobsleigh four-man world championship medalists since 1930
bobsleighsport.com profile
FIBT profile

1976 births
German male bobsledders
Living people
Sportspeople from Frankfurt (Oder)